South Carolina Highway 23 (SC 23) is a  primary state highway in the U.S. state of South Carolina. It serves to connect Edgefield and Batesburg-Leesville with Columbia via U.S. Route 1 (US 1).

Route description
SC 23 is a two-lane rural highway that travels from Modoc, within the Sumter National Forest and near Lake Strom Thurmond, to Batesburg-Leesville. The highway travels through mostly either forest or farmland, while connecting with the city and towns of Edgefield, Johnston, Ward, Ridge Spring and Monetta. Between Monetta and Batesburg-Leesville, SC 23 parallels to the north of US 1.

History

The first SC 23 was an original state highway that traveled from SC 3 in Pee Dee, through Latta and Dillon, becoming NC 22 at the North Carolina state line near Rowland. In 1927, US 217 was assigned on the entire route; after a year, SC 23 was decommissioned.

The second, and current, SC 23 was established around 1929, traveling from SC 39 in Monetta to US 1 in Leesville. In 1936, SC 23 was extended west to its current western terminus in Modoc, replacing part of SC 39.

Major intersections

Edgefield truck route

South Carolina Highway 25 Truck (SC 25 Truck) is a truck route that is partially within the western and northeastern parts of Edgefield. It has concurrencies with U.S. Route 25 Truck (US 25 Truck; actually the US 25 mainline signed as a truck route), US 25 Bus., SC 430 Conn., and SC 430. Unlike some truck routes, it is well marked along its path.

The truck route begins at an intersection with the SC 23 mainline. Here, the truck route travels to the north-northwest, concurrent with US 25 Truck (US 25). They curve to the north-northeast and cross over Beaverdam Creek. They curve back to the north-northwest and leave the city limits of Edgefield. They curve back to the north-northeast. At an intersection with US 25 and US 25 Bus., SC 23 Truck turns right onto the business route. The two highways travel to the southeast. At an intersection with Crest Road, SC 23 Truck splits off to the southeast, concurrent with the unsigned SC 430 Conn., while US 25 Bus. bends to the south-southeast. Then, they re-enter Edgefield. One block later, the two highways intersect Meeting Street, the northbound lanes of which is SC 430 north; the southbound lanes lead to US 25 Bus. south. At this intersection, SC 430 Conn. ends, and SC 23 Truck begins a concurrency with SC 430. The two highways take Crest Road to the southeast. They curve to the east-southeast and leave Edgefield again. They curve to the southeast and reach their terminus, an intersection with SC 23.

See also

References

External links

 
 SC 23 at Virginia Highways' South Carolina Highways Annex

023
Transportation in McCormick County, South Carolina
Transportation in Edgefield County, South Carolina
Transportation in Saluda County, South Carolina
Transportation in Lexington County, South Carolina